

Alfred Philippi (3 August 1903 – 15 June 1994) was a German general during World War II. He was a recipient of the Knight's Cross of the Iron Cross.

Awards and decorations

 Knight's Cross of the Iron Cross on 14 May 1944 as Oberst and commander of 535th Grenadier Regiment

References

Citations

Bibliography

 

1903 births
1994 deaths
People from the Rhine Province
Recipients of the Knight's Cross of the Iron Cross
German prisoners of war in World War II held by the United States
Major generals of the German Army (Wehrmacht)
Military personnel from Saarland